Nigerite Limited is a firm that manufactures roofing and ceiling sheets and provides building components to the construction and building industry in Nigeria. It was established in April 1959 as a joint venture between the Western Regional government, Eternit Group who had majority shareholding, Patterson Zochonis and John Holt.

The firm began operations in 1961 at Ikeja conducting business under the name, Asbestos Cement Company. The firm manufactured asbestos sheets and introduced various roofing brands to the market including Aminatus roofing sheets used for both roofing and cladding, Super Light Weight, Litespan, and Super Seven Sheets. In 1964, it would have begun making pressure pipes largely for a water supply and sewage draining scheme initiated by the Western regional government.

Nigerite's products are diverse and can be used for projects of varying cost valuations. In 2011, Nigerite brands had a market share of 35% in the market for low end roofing sheets and 15% at the high-end market.

In 2015, the firm launched Kalsi, an Etex brand. The Kalsi products has a pre-fabricated component that can be used to build structures.

References

Construction and civil engineering companies of Nigeria
1959 establishments in Nigeria
Construction and civil engineering companies established in 1959